Charles Jamaal Blake is an American Democratic politician who represented the 36th district in the Arkansas House of Representatives from 2015 to 2019. The district contains a portion of Little Rock and is entirely contained in Pulaski County. Blake resigned in 2019 to work for Little Rock's mayor, being replaced by Denise Jones Ennett in a special election.

References

External links

|-

1983 births
20th-century African-American people
21st-century African-American politicians
21st-century American politicians
African-American state legislators in Arkansas
Baptists from Arkansas
Grinnell College alumni
Little Rock Central High School alumni
Living people
Democratic Party members of the Arkansas House of Representatives
Politicians from Little Rock, Arkansas